Frazier Lake Airpark  is a small privately owned, public use non-towered airport located near Hollister, in San Benito County, California, United States. It is located between two valleys that run from San Jose to Hollister. The nearest notable cities near Frazier Lake are Gilroy and Hollister.

Frazier Lake has two runways, one turf and one water. The turf runway, 5/23, is closed when it is too wet to avoid aircraft landing on a too-soft runway. It may also be closed at other times as necessary.

The first Saturday of each month is antique airplane display day. Antique and homebuilt aircraft are on display and the public is invited to view them.

References 
Frazier Lake Airpark (official website)

External links 

Airports in San Benito County, California